Qalat-e Bala (also Romanized as Qalāt-e Bālā; also known as Kalāt and Kalāt-e Bālā) is a village in Tazian Rural District, in the Central District of Bandar Abbas County, Hormozgan Province, Iran. At the 2006 census, its population was 2,898, in 650 families.

References 

Populated places in Bandar Abbas County